The secretary of science and technology is the head of the Department of Science and Technology and is a member of the president's Cabinet.

The position was created in 1987 by then president Corazon Aquino, and was first assumed by Antonio Arizabal.

The current secretary is Renato Solidum Jr., who holds office since July 22, 2022.

List

Notes

References

External links
DOST website

 
Philippines
Science and Technology